Oliver Joseph Nanini (1955 – December 4, 2000) was an American rock drummer, most famous for being the percussionist and a founding member of new wave group Wall of Voodoo during their heyday in the 1980s. He was known for playing with pots, pans, and other objects. This arrangement can be seen in the motion picture Urgh! A Music War in which Wall Of Voodoo performed a live version of the song "Back In Flesh" from the Dark Continent album, and also later in the video for the hit single "Mexican Radio". Along with Stan Ridgway and Bill Noland, he left the band after their performance at the US Festival in 1983. Nanini went on to become one of the co-founders of the neo-traditional band The Lonesome Strangers and played on their first record, Lonesome Pine.

He was also the drummer for numerous 1970s punk bands, including Black Randy and the Metrosquad, The Plugz, and Bags.
Before his death, he was a session musician for Dangerhouse Records recording with many bands, notably recording with the band Sienna Nanini during the 1990's, Nanini and his fellow musician, known only as Lamb Cannon, believed the "Los Angeles club scene" was "disgusting" and decided to commit to a Cabaret act, via the album Pants down time, released after his passing. He was born in Japan in 1955 to a United States military family. Nanini died at his Atlanta home on December 4, 2000, of a brain hemorrhage, at age 45.

References

1955 births
2000 deaths
Musicians from Los Angeles
American rock drummers
Punk rock drummers
Deaths from intracranial aneurysm
American people of Japanese descent
20th-century American drummers
American male drummers
20th-century American male musicians